Cryptodesmidae, is a millipede family of the order Polydesmida. The family includes 18 species belongs to seven genera.

Genera
Diaphanacme
Maderesmus
Pocodesmus
Peridontodesmus
Pinesmus
Sierresmus
Singhalocryptus

References

External links 

Polydesmida
Millipede families